Laporte is a hamlet in the Canadian province of Saskatchewan. Listed as a designated place by Statistics Canada, the hamlet had a population of five in the Canada 2006 Census.

References 

Chesterfield No. 261, Saskatchewan
Former designated places in Saskatchewan
Hamlets in Saskatchewan